The following is a complete list of medalists at the 1960 Summer Olympics, held in Rome, Italy, from 25 August to 11 September 1960.

{| id="toc" class="toc" summary="Contents"
|-
| style="text-align:center;" colspan=3|Contents
|-
|
Athletics
Basketball
Boxing
Canoeing
Cycling
Diving
Equestrian
|valign=top|
Fencing
Field hockey
Football
Gymnastics
Modern pentathlon
Rowing
Sailing
|valign=top|
Shooting
Swimming
Water polo
Weightlifting
Wrestling
|-
| style="text-align:center;" colspan=3| Medal leaders       References
|}


Athletics

Men’s events

Women’s events

Basketball

Boxing

Canoeing

Men’s events

Women’s events

Cycling

Diving

Equestrian

Fencing

Men’s events

Women’s events

Field hockey

Football

Gymnastics

Men’s events

Women’s events

Modern pentathlon

Rowing

Sailing

Shooting

Swimming

Men’s events

Women’s events

Water polo

Weightlifting

Wrestling

Freestyle

Greco-Roman

Medal leaders 
Athletes that won at least three total medals are listed below.

See also
 1960 Summer Olympics medal table

External links

Medalists
1960